Cyperus amuricus, commonly known as the Asian flatsedge, is a species of sedge that is native to parts of Asia.

See also
List of Cyperus species

References

amuricus
Plants described in 1859
 Taxa named by Karl Maximovich
Flora of China
Flora of Korea
Flora of Japan
Flora of Taiwan
Flora of Tibet